Milton James Rhode Acorn (March 30, 1923 – August 20, 1986), nicknamed The People's Poet by his peers, was a Canadian poet, writer, and playwright.

Early life
He was born in Prince Edward Island, and grew up in Charlottetown. He joined the armed forces during World War II at the age of eighteen.

Career

During World War II, on a trans-Atlantic crossing, Acorn suffered a wound from depth charges. The wound was severe enough for him to receive a disability pension from Veterans Affairs for most of his life. He returned to Prince Edward Island and moved to Montreal, Quebec in 1956 and was for a time a member of the Labor-Progressive Party. He spent several years living at the Hotel Waverly in Toronto, Ontario.

In Montreal, he published some of his early poems in the political magazine, New Frontiers. In 1956 he self-published a mimeographed chapbook, In Love and Anger, his first collection of poems.  In the 1950s some of his poetry was published in the magazine Canadian Forum.

He was for a short time married to poet Gwendolyn MacEwen.

In the mid-1960s, he moved to Vancouver and joined the League for Socialist Action. In 1967, Acorn helped found the "underground" newspaper The Georgia Straight in Vancouver, BC. In 1969 he published his poetry collection I've Tasted My Blood.

Acorn was awarded the Canadian Poets Award in 1970 and the Governor General's Award in 1976 for his collection of poems, The Island Means Minago. In 1977, Acorn introduced the Jackpine sonnet, a form designed to be as irregular and spikey (and Canadian) as a jack pine tree, but with internal structure and integrity. Without a fixed number of lines and with varied line lengths, the Jackpine sonnet depends on interweaving internal rhymes, assonance and occasional end-rhymes.

In July 1986, he suffered a heart attack and was admitted to the hospital. Acorn died in his home town of Charlottetown on August 20, 1986, due to complications associated with his heart condition and diabetes. According to fellow poet and  friend Jim Deahl, he had "lost his will to live after the death of a younger sister."

Milton Acorn People's Poetry Award
In 1987, the Milton Acorn People's Poetry Award was established in his memory by Ted Plantos. It is presented annually to an outstanding "people's poet." The award was initially $250 (since raised to $500) and a medallion, modelled after the one given to Milton Acorn.

Acorn on film
In 1971 Acorn was the subject of a documentary, Milton Acorn: The People’s Poet, which was aired on the CBC program Thirty Minutes. The National Film Board of Canada produced two films on Acorn's life and works. The first is entitled In Love and Anger:  Milton Acorn - Poet, and came out in 1984. The second is called A Wake for Milton. It was produced in 1988.

Bibliography
1956:In Love and Anger 
1960:Against a League of Liars 
1960:The Brain's the Target 
1963:Jawbreakers
1969:I've Tasted My Blood 
1971:I Shout Love and On Shaving Off His Beard 
1972:More Poems for People
1975:The Island 
1977:The Road to Charlottetown (with Cedric Smith)
1977:Jackpine Sonnets 
1982:Captain Neal MacDougal & the Naked Goddess 
1983:Dig Up My Heart 
1986:Whiskey Jack HMS Press (Toronto)

Posthumous collections
1987:A Stand of Jackpine (with James Deahl,)
1987:The Uncollected Acorn 
1987:I Shout Love and Other Poems 
1988:Hundred Proof Earth 
1996:To Hear the Faint Bells

Anthologies
2002:Coastlines: The Poetry of Atlantic Canada, ed. Anne Compton, Laurence Hutchman, Ross Leckie and Robin McGrath (Goose Lane Editions)

Discography
More Poems for People Audio CD reading Canadian Poetry Association, (1986 audio tape / 2001 CD)

Literary awards
1970  Canadian Poets' Award, more commonly known as the People's Poet Award and Medal
1975  Governor General's Award
1977  Honorary Doctorate of Law Degree (from the University of Prince Edward Island)
1986  Life member Canadian Poetry Association

See also

Canadian poetry
List of Canadian poets

References

External links
Atlantic Canadian Poets' Archive:  Milton Acorn - Biography, 1 poem (Knowing I Live in a Dark Age), poetry analysis, and bibliography.
Canadian Poetry Online: Milton Acorn - Biography and 6 poems (The Island, I Shout Love, What I Know of God is This, Hummingbird, Live With Me On Earth Under the Invisible Daylight Moon, The Natural History of Elephants)
Milton Acorn's entry in The Canadian Encyclopedia
Records of Milton Acorn are held by Simon Fraser University's Special Collections and Rare Books

1923 births
1986 deaths
20th-century Canadian poets
20th-century Canadian male writers
Canadian male poets
Governor General's Award-winning poets
Writers from Charlottetown
Chapbook writers
Canadian socialists
Canadian military personnel of World War II